Aruküla SK is an Estonian multi-sports club, which is located in Aruküla, Harju County. The strongest section of the club is handball section, which competes in Meistriliiga.

The club was established in 1996.

References

Estonian handball clubs
Sports clubs in Estonia
Raasiku Parish